CPU shielding is a practice where on a multiprocessor system or on a CPU with multiple cores, real-time tasks can run on one CPU or core while non-real-time tasks run on another.

The operating system must be able to set a CPU affinity for both processes and interrupts.

Kernel space 
In Linux in order to shield CPUs from individual interrupts being serviced on them you have to make sure that the following kernel configuration parameter is set:
 CONFIG_IRQBALANCE

See also 

 Multi-core
 Multiprocessing
 Processor affinity
 Real-time computing

External links 
 Shielded CPUs: Real-Time Performance in Standard Linux

Operating system technology
Real-time computing